The 1986 ARFU Asian Rugby Championship was the 10th edition  of the tournament, and was played in Bangkok, Thailand. The 8 teams were divided into two pools and played single round-robin matches. The final match was held between the winners of the two pools, and the third-place match between the runners-up. South Korea won the tournament.

Tournament

Pool A

External links  
 The Rugby Archive (archived) -- The dates are incorrect
 ESPN UK (archived)

Asia Rugby Championship